The Bellefonte Area School District is a midsized, rural, public school district which covers the Borough of Bellefonte and Benner Township, Marion Township, Spring Township and Walker Township in Centre County, Pennsylvania. According to 2000 federal census data, it served a resident population of 21,480. By 2010, the district's population increased to 25,351 people. In 2009, the district residents' per capita income was $18,308 a year, while the median family income was $46,786.

Schools

Secondary 
Bellefonte Area High School (Grades 9-12)
Bellefonte Area Middle School (Grades 6-8)

Elementary 
All Elementary Schools are Grades K-5.

 Bellefonte Elementary School
 Benner Elementary School
 Marion Walker Elementary School
 Pleasant Gap Elementary School

Mascot
The mascot for the Bellefonte Area School District has been the Red Raider, a Native American, since 1936. In 2015, the district made its primary logo a red "B", while the red, headdressed Native American was made a secondary logo. A petition to replace the mascot was started in June 2020 following the George Floyd protests. On Tuesday, April 13, 2021, the Bellefonte Area School District Board of Directors voted by a vote of 8-1 to retire the “Red Raider” logo after hearing from two dozen community members in support of the change.

Extracurriculars
The district provides a wide variety of clubs, activities and interscholastic sports.

Athletics 
The district funds:

Boys:
Baseball – AAAA, 2016 PIAA AAA State Champions
Basketball- AAA
Bowling – AAAA
Cross Country – AA
Football – AAA
Golf – AAA
Lacrosse – AA (club)
Soccer – AA
Swimming and Diving – AA
Track and Field – AAA
Wrestling – AAA

Girls:
Basketball – AAA
Bowling – AAAA
Cheer – AAAA
Cross Country – AA
Golf – AAA
Gymnastics – AAAA
Lacrosse – AAAA
Soccer (Fall) – AA
Softball – AAA 2010 PIAA State Champions
Swimming and Diving – AA
Track and Field – AAA
Volleyball – AA

Middle School sports:

Boys:
Basketball
Football
Soccer
Wrestling	
Lacrosse
Girls:
Basketball
Cheer
Softball
Soccer 
Lacrosse

According to PIAA directory July 2013

References

External links 
 Bellefonte Area School District
 PIAA

School districts in Centre County, Pennsylvania